Chlorolestes apricans is a species of damselfly in the family Synlestidae.

Distribution and status
This damselfly is endemic to South Africa where it has a restricted range in the Eastern Cape.

Habitat
This species is found along streams in both open and shaded situations. It is threatened by habitat loss resulting from the trampling of stream banks by cattle and from the shading of streams by the alien invasive black wattle, Acacia mearnsii.

References

External links

 Chlorolestes apricans on African Dragonflies and Damselflies Online

Synlestidae
Odonata of Africa
Insects of South Africa
Insects described in 1975
Taxonomy articles created by Polbot